The 1977 Utah Utes football team was an American football team that represented the University of Utah as a member of the Western Athletic Conference (WAC) during the 1977 NCAA Division I football season. In their first season under head coach Wayne Howard, the Utes compiled an overall record of 3–8 with a mark of 2–5 against conference opponents, placing fourth in the WAC. Home games were played on campus at Robert Rice Stadium in Salt Lake City.

Schedule

Game summaries

Utah State

Utah recorded its first shutout in seven years.

References

Utah
Utah Utes football seasons
Utah Utes football